Alexander von Hugo is a German former professional tennis player. He had a good record competing at the Summer Universiade, winning three medals for his country, including a singles bronze medal in Sicily in 1997.

Active on the professional tour in the 1990s, von Hugo made his only ATP Tour main draw appearance at the 1995 German Open in Hamburg, where he partnered Helge Capell in the doubles. He also featured in the qualifying draw for the singles and won his first match, over Sascha Schewiola.

References

External links
 
 

Year of birth missing (living people)
Living people
German male tennis players
Universiade medalists in tennis
Universiade silver medalists for Germany
Universiade bronze medalists for Germany
Medalists at the 1997 Summer Universiade
Medalists at the 1999 Summer Universiade